Francis Barry may refer to:

Sir Francis Barry, 1st Baronet (1825–1907), British businessman and politician
Francis Barry, president of the Farmers' Bank of Delaware from 1868 to 1878

See also
Frank Barry (disambiguation)